William Jackson (born 5 August 1820 in Basford, Nottinghamshire; details of death unknown) was an English first-class cricketer active 1844–48 who played for Nottinghamshire.

References

1820 births
Date of death unknown
English cricketers
Nottinghamshire cricketers
Gentlemen of Nottinghamshire cricketers
Nottingham Cricket Club cricketers
North v South cricketers